Tan-Tan is a province in the Moroccan economic region of Guelmim-Oued Noun. Its population in 2004 was 70,146. 

The major cities and towns are: 
 El Ouatia
 Tan-Tan

Subdivisions
The province is divided administratively into the following:

References

 
Tan-Tan Province